Richard or Rick Crawford may refer to:

 Richard Crawford (music historian), American music historian
 Richard Crawford (director), British theatre director and actor
 Richard Crawford (American football) (born 1990), American football cornerback
 Richard Crawford (golfer) (born 1939), American golfer
 Richard Crawford (sport shooter) (born 1934), American Olympic sport shooter
 Rick Crawford (racing driver) (born 1958), American stock car racing driver and convicted sex offender 
 Rick Crawford (politician) (born 1966), U.S. representative from Arkansas
 Rick Crawford (cycling), American cycling coach